Michał Szewczyk (29 July 1934 – 8 February 2021) was a Polish actor.

Filmography

 (1954)
 (1956)
 (1956)
 (1956)
 (1957)
 (1957)
Eroica (1958)
 (1958)
 (1958)
 (1958)
 (1958)
 (1959)
 (1959)
Rzeczywistość (1960)
 (1961)
Tonight a City Will Die (1961)
 (1962)
The Two Who Stole the Moon (1962)
 (1962)
 (1962)
The Impossible Goodbye (1962)
Weekendy (1963)
 (1963)
The Law and the Fist (1964)
Pięciu (1964)
Panienka z okienka (1964)
 (1964)
 (1965)
Kapitan Sowa na tropie (1965)
 (1965)
 (1966)
 (1966)
Westerplatte (1967)
Stawka większa niż życie (1967)
Pieczona gęś (1967)
 (1967)
 (1967)
 (1968)
 (1969)
 (1969)
 (1970)
 (1970)
 (1971)
 (1971)
 (1971)
 (1971)
 (1971)
 (1974)
Polonia Restituta (1981)
Przyjaciele (1981)
Short Working Day (1981)
 (1982)
 (1982)
The Mother of Kings (1982)
 (1983)
 (1984)
 (1984)
 (1985)
The Young Magician (1986)
 (1987)
 (1987)
Mr Tański (1987)
 (1988)
Desperacja (1988)
 (1991)
Klan (1997)
 (1998)
Syzyfowe prace (2000)
 (2000)
 (2000)
 (2003–2005)
Na Wspólnej (2003)
 (2006)
Święty Rafał Kalinowski (2007)
 (2009)
Weekend (2010)
 (2011)
Koleżanki (2011)
Mit o „Szarym” (2012)
 (2012–2013)
Medics (2013)
Secret Wars (Służby specjalne) (2014)
 (2014)
Na dobre i na złe (2016)

Dubbing

The Wonderful World of Puss 'n Boots (1969)
 (1983)
 (1986)
Niezwykłe przygody pluszowych misiów (1990)
Za siedmioma duchami (1997–2000)

Awards
Medal of the 40th Anniversary of People's Poland (1985)
Gold Cross of Merit (1985)
Meritorious Activist of Culture Badge (1985)
Silver Medal for Merit to Culture – Gloria Artis (2015)
Gold Medal for Merit to Culture – Gloria Artis (2020)

References

1934 births
2021 deaths
Polish male actors
People from Łódź
Recipient of the Meritorious Activist of Culture badge